Aeroscope was a type of compressed air camera for making films, constructed by Polish inventor Kazimierz Prószyński in 1909 (French patent from 10 April 1909) and built in England since 1911, at first by Newman & Sinclair, and from 1912 by Cherry Kearton Limited.

Background
Patented in England in 1910 by the Polish inventor Kazimierz Prószyński, Aeroscope was the first successful hand-held operated film camera. It has been powered by compressed air pumped before filming into the camera with a simple hand pump, similar to the one we still use to pump bicycle tyres. Filming with Aeroscope, a cameraman did not have to turn the crank to advance the material filming, as in all cameras of that time, so he could operate the camera with both hands, holding the camera and controlling the focus. This made it possible to film with the Aeroscope hand-held in most difficult circumstances, as well as made possible to film from airplanes, also for military purposes. Camera carried  of 35mm film and, once pressurised, could work with no further pumping for up to 10 minutes. The Aeroscope was known for its simplicity and reliability.

Popularity
Hundreds of light and relatively compact Aeroscope cameras were used by the British War Office for the combat cameramen on the battlefields of World War I, and by all newsreel cameramen all over world, until the late 1920s. Aeroscope has been used among others by Arthur Herbert Malins recognized by Kelly (1997, Page 60) as “the most famous of the war cinematographers” who used it at the battle of the Somme. As several of the cameramen died filming from the firing lines Aeroscope got a name of camera of death.

In 1928 Prószyński built an improved version of his camera, with an air pressure meter, but the more practical spring cameras like Eyemo and later Bolex took over. However, even by the beginning of World War II, some of the improved Aeroscope cameras were in use by the British combat cameramen.

See also 
Eyemo
Konvas
Filmo
Debrie Parvo

References

External links 
Photograph of the Aeroscope camera by National Media Museum, United Kingdom
 Profile of Kazimierz Prószyński at "Who is Who of Victorian Cinema"
 "The Cameraman Who Filmed The Western Front", by Dr George Bailey, 2006, Published in Mars & Clio, the Bulletin of the British Commission for Military History, Summer 2006.
 "Waging The Movie Battle on the European Powers" by Ernest A. Dench, The Macmillan Company, New York 1915 (now in the Public Domain)

Film and video technology
Movie cameras
Polish inventions
Science and technology in Poland